Damandeep Singh Baggan (born 8 June 1977) is an Indian actor and also a dub-over voice actor. He is also named as Daman Baggan for short.

In addition to Punjabi, his native language, he speaks English and Hindi. He has dubbed in Hindi for Jim Carrey's roles, among other actors.

Filmography
 2001 - Tera Mera Saath Rahen
 2003 - Ishq Vishk
 2006 - Vivah
 2008 - Fashion
 2008 - Ek Vivaah... Aisa Bhi as Happy Singh
 2009 - Straight as Pakwan Singh

Television

Dubbing career
He's been dubbing for channels such as Sony Entertainment Television, SAB and Zee TV.
Have been a brand ambassador for Mountain Dew (a Pepsi product), Tata Indicom, Aircel, Maruti Suzuki Swift .. IPL Kings xi Punjab, Ad Serials: Hotel Kingston (Star One), Pepsi ADA (Sahara One), Playhouse Disney (Disney Channel), Sunn Yaar Chill Maar (Bindaas channel), Dil Mil Gaye (Star One)

Dubbing roles

Animated series

Live action television series

Animated series

Live action films

South Indian films

Bollywood & Hollywood films

Animated films

See also
Dubbing (filmmaking)
List of Indian Dubbing Artists

References

External links
 

1977 births
People from Patiala
Male actors from Punjab, India
Indian male voice actors
Male actors in Hindi cinema
Living people
Punjabi people